Scream is the second solo album by English rock and roll vocalist Tony Martin, after his second and final stint with Black Sabbath. It was released on 8 November 2005. The song "Raising Hell" features former Black Sabbath drummer Cozy Powell and keyboardist Geoff Nicholls. On most songs, Martin's son Joe Harford plays guitar. Nearly all other instruments are played by Martin himself (including a violin solo on "Scream").

Track listing

Trivia
"Raising Hell" is actually an instrumental demo recorded by Black Sabbath with Martin before the Dehumanizer recording sessions, which is re-recorded and used on this album.

Band members
Tony Martin: lead vocals, guitar, bass, violin, drums
Joe Harford: guitar
Geoff Nicholls: keyboards
Cozy Powell: drums on "Raising Hell"

References

 

Tony Martin (British singer) albums
2005 albums
MTM Records albums